Boyer–Moore may refer to:
 Boyer–Moore majority vote algorithm
 Boyer–Moore string-search algorithm
 Boyer–Moore theorem prover